Mont Néry (in Töitschu Neryschthuare - 3,075m) is a mountain of the Pennine Alps in Aosta Valley, northwestern Italy.

Features 
The mountain si located between the Ayas Valley and the Lys Valley. It is the highest summit of the Frudière Range, part of the larger Monte Rosa Massif. The mountain is formed from a mixture of gneiss and schist rocks. It was first climbed in 1873.

References

Mountains of the Alps
Alpine three-thousanders
Mountains of Aosta Valley